Illuminata is a 1998 romantic comedy film directed by John Turturro and written by Brandon Cole and Turturro, based on Cole's play Imperfect Love. The cinematographer was Harris Savides. The puppet sequences were done by Roman Paska. Music for the 'Tuccio Operatic Dream Sequence' was composed by Richard Termini.

Plot
The plot follows the backstage dramas of a turn-of-the-century New York theater company struggling to produce a new work.

Cast
John Turturro as Tuccio, the playwright
Katherine Borowitz as Rachel, Tuccio's girlfriend, an actress
Beverly D'Angelo as Astergourd, a theater owner
Donal McCann as Pallenchio, Astergourd's husband
Georgina Cates as Simone, an actress
Susan Sarandon as Celimene, an aging actress
Christopher Walken as Umberto Bevalaqua, an influential theater critic
Ben Gazzara as Old Flavio, an actor in the company
Rufus Sewell as Dominique, a young actor in the company
Bill Irwin as Marco, a bit player and the object of Bevalaqua's affections
Aida Turturro as Marta
Rocco Sisto as Prince
Matthew Sussman as Piero

Reception

Awards
 1998 Cannes Film Festival – Palme d'Or Nomination (John Turturro)

References

Bibliography
 Martin, Mick. DVD & Video Guide 2007. New York: Ballantine Books, 2006.
 "Backstage With a Cast Of Foibles and Follies" The New York Times, August 6, 1999.

External links

1998 films
American romantic comedy films
Films set in New York City
American films based on plays
Films set in the 1900s
1998 romantic comedy films
Films directed by John Turturro
1990s English-language films
1990s American films